Dana Frankfort (born 1971, Houston, Texas) is an artist based in Houston and a painting professor at University of Houston. Her work often engages with the history of abstract art and features bright colors, gestural brushwork, and text.

Frankfort earned a BA from Brandeis University and received her MFA in 1997 from Yale School of Art, New Haven. She also attended Skowhegan School of Painting and Sculpture in 1997. Frankfort was a Core Fellow at the Glassell School of Art at the Museum of Fine Arts, Houston in 1999. She received a Guggenheim Fellowship in 2006.

She has shown work internationally in exhibitions including What’s So Funny at Brooklyn Fireproof and The Triumph of Painting at the Saatchi Gallery in London. Her work was included in several exhibitions at The Jewish Museum and her work Star of David (Orange) is part of The Jewish Museum's permanent collection.

References

External links
Official Website

1971 births
Yale School of Art alumni
Living people
American women painters
Boston University faculty
Painters from Texas
21st-century American women artists
American women academics
Skowhegan School of Painting and Sculpture alumni